Jake Allen (born August 7, 1990) is a Canadian professional ice hockey goaltender for the Montreal Canadiens of the National Hockey League (NHL). Allen was selected by the St. Louis Blues in the second round of the 2008 NHL Entry Draft with the 34th overall pick. Allen won the Stanley Cup with the Blues in 2019.

Early life
Allen was born in Fredericton, New Brunswick, the son of Kurt and Susan Allen. Allen grew up in St. Stephen, New Brunswick, where his father worked as a high school teacher until 1999. He started playing hockey at a young age, first as a skater, then switched to the goalie position.

Playing career

Amateur
Allen played for the Midget "AAA" Canadiens under Kevin Pottle, before being drafted in the third round of the QMJHL draft to the St. John's Fog Devils. After one season with the Fog Devils, Allen was picked to play for the Under-18 World Hockey Championship in Kazan, Russia where he won gold and was named tournament MVP and top goalie. In 2008, the Fog Devils were sold and moved to Montreal, becoming the Montreal Junior Hockey Club. In 2009, Allen represented Canada at the World Junior Ice Hockey Championship in Saskatoon, winning silver after posting 4 wins and 1 subsequent loss in the final to the Americans. Allen was traded to Drummondville after the World Juniors tournament, and posted a record of 18 wins and 3 losses with a save percentage of .933% and 1.75 GAA. He was named the recipient of the Jacques Plante Memorial Trophy as goalie of the year in the QMJHL in 2009–10.

Professional

St. Louis Blues

On October 22, 2008, Allen was signed by the St. Louis Blues to an entry-level contract. He made his NHL debut during the playoffs on April 30, 2012, coming in to briefly relieve Brian Elliott late in the Blues' second game against the Los Angeles Kings in the Western Conference semi-finals. During the shortened 2012–13 season, Allen was recalled to the Blues and recorded his first career NHL start and win in a 4–3 overtime victory over the Detroit Red Wings on February 13, 2013. He has scored one goal.

On April 17, 2014, Allen was named the Aldege "Baz" Bastien Memorial Award winner as the American Hockey League's (AHL) Outstanding Goaltender for the 2013–14 season.

On March 26, 2016, Allen shut out the Washington Capitals to help the Blues break their record for longest stretch without allowing a goal. In the 2015–16 season, he had a 2.35 GAA with a .920 save percentage.

During the 2016–17 season, Allen was pulled four times in six starts during a rough stretch of play, including a poor showing on January 19, where he allowed four goals on 10 shots against the Washington Capitals. Allen did not travel with the team to Winnipeg for the January 21 game against the Winnipeg Jets, and stayed home to be with his newborn daughter. He was scheduled to rejoin the team on January 23, for the remaining two games of the road trip. His play soon rebounded however, and he was named Second Star of the Week on February 13. Allen went 3–0–0 with a 1.00 goals-against average, a .967 save percentage along with his 13th career shutout against the Ottawa Senators (February 7). His two other wins were against the Toronto Maple Leafs (2–1 OT, 31 saves, February 9), and Montreal Canadiens (February 11).

Allen won the Stanley Cup in 2019 as the backup to rookie Jordan Binnington in the 2019 Stanley Cup playoffs. He had begun the season as the starting goaltender, but after the team dove to last place in the league half way through the season the young rookie was given a shot. While Binnington shone in goal, Allen finished the second half of the season with a pedestrian 5–4–4 record. During this time, Allen chose to take an active role in the team's success while backing up Binnington.

Montreal Canadiens

On September 2, 2020, Allen was traded to the Montreal Canadiens with a 2022 seventh-round pick in exchange for 2020 third-round and seventh-round picks. On October 14, Allen signed a two-year, $5.75 million contract extension with the Canadiens taking him through the 2022–23 season.

Allen immediately distinguished himself as a backup goaltender to Carey Price, especially during a stretch of the 2020–21 season where Price was unable to play due to a concussion. Allen's performance in net was widely credited with allowing the Canadiens to make the 2021 Stanley Cup playoffs, though Allen did not play during the playoffs themselves following Price's return. It was widely assumed that Allen would be taken by the Seattle Kraken in the 2021 NHL Expansion Draft, as the rules allowed for teams to protect only one goaltender, and Price had a contractual guarantee of such protection. However, Price and Canadiens general manager Marc Bergevin opted to waive Price's contractual guarantee and expose him, allowing them to protect Allen while calculating that Price's age and salary would deter the Kraken from taking him.

Following Price's entering the NHL's Player Assistance Program at the start of the 2021–22 season, Allen was again the Canadiens' starting goaltender. He was generally judged to be performing strongly even as the team struggled to score, notably posting a 45-save shutout in an October 28 game against the San Jose Sharks that represented the Canadiens' first victory in San Jose since November 23, 1999. On January 12, 2022, Allen sustained a groin injury in a game against the Boston Bruins, and it was announced that he would miss eight weeks of the season. He returned to the team for a March 17 game against the Dallas Stars, making several noteworthy saves in a 4–3 overtime loss. Allen made ten more appearances in net with the Canadiens, but was forced to exit an April 9 game against the Toronto Maple Leafs after suffering a lower body injury while attempting to stop a shot by Leafs star forward Auston Matthews. Shortly afterward he called it a "season from hell." As a result of this new groin injury he missed the remainder of the season.

In the off-season of 2022, it became clear that Price would at a minimum be unable to play in the 2022–23 season, and that his career was likely over. As a result, Allen, entering the final year of his contract with the Canadiens, became its new starting goaltender. On September 28, general manager Kent Hughes confirmed that he was hoping to negotiate a contract extension with Allen. On October 1, Allen signed a two-year, $7.7 million extension with the Canadiens locking him up until the end of the 2024–5 season.

Personal life

In 2016, Allen created a painting of the St. Louis skyline for the Kidney Foundation of Canada Atlantic Branch's "A Brush of Hope" Celebrity Art Auction. His painting was auctioned off on ebay.ca in a ten-day online auction. 

In January 2017, Allen's fiancé, Shannon Adams, gave birth to their first daughter. The couple welcomed their second daughter in April 2018, then married in August of the same year. Their third daughter was born in October of 2022 while he played for the Canadiens, and he noted afterward "my two other daughters are born in St. Louis. Now we get a Montrealer and a Quebecer. Our first Canadian baby. The other two fortunately have dual citizenship for them in the future."

Career statistics

Regular season and playoffs

Awards and honours

References

External links
 

1990 births
Canadian ice hockey goaltenders
Chicago Wolves players
Drummondville Voltigeurs players
Ice hockey people from New Brunswick
Living people
Montreal Canadiens players
Montreal Junior Hockey Club players
Peoria Rivermen (AHL) players
Sportspeople from Fredericton
St. John's Fog Devils players
St. Louis Blues draft picks
St. Louis Blues players
Stanley Cup champions